American football was introduced as a World Games invitational sport at the 2005 World Games in Duisburg. There was also an American Football tournament at the 2017 World Games in Wroclaw. Both times only a competition for the male sides was held with four national teams participating. In 2005 the participating countries were Germany, Australia, Sweden and France while in 2017 the US, Germany, France and Poland participated. The U.S. was represented by college players.

Men's

Men's flag football

Women's flag football

See also
American football at the Summer Olympics
American football at the 1932 Summer Olympics
IFAF World Championship

External links
American football at the 2005 Games
2005 Games results

References